Atilla Gülan (born August 19, 1959) is a retired four-star Turkish Air Forces general. He was the 33nd Commander of the Turkish Air Force and retired by the decision of the Supreme Military Council dated August 4, 2022.

He graduated from the Turkish Air Force Academy in 1980. He was promoted to major general in 2009, lieutenant general in 2013, and full general in 2017. Atilla Gülan is the Turkish Air Force Commander since 19 August 2022.

References

External links

 

1959 births
Living people
Turkish Air Force generals
Commanders of the Turkish Air Force
People from Elazığ